Linn of Tummel is a  woodland property at the confluence of the rivers Garry and Tummel, near Pitlochry in Perthshire, Scotland. It is owned and maintained by the National Trust for Scotland, and is adjacent to the Trust's property at Killiecrankie.

The name Linn of Tummel comes from the Scots Gaelic and means "pool of tumbling stream". The name comes from the fact that the River Tummel used to drop down over a fall to meet the River Garry; however, in 1950 the fall ceased when a new hydro-electric plant raised the level of both rivers and created Loch Faskally.

The wildlife include pine martens and otters, while the flora includes pearl-bordered fritillary and lily of the valley.

The National Trust for Scotland have owned the Linn since 1944, when it was given to them by Dr George Freeland Barbour of Bonskeid.

References

External links
National Trust for Scotland, property details

National Trust for Scotland properties
Protected areas of Perth and Kinross
Sites of Special Scientific Interest in Scotland